CIXM-FM is a Canadian radio station that broadcasts a country music format at 105.3 FM in Whitecourt, Alberta. The station was founded and formerly owned by Edward & Remi Tardif.

CIXM was granted a license by the Canadian Radio-television and Telecommunications Commission in 2005, and signed on the air on September 18, 2006.

The station is the host broadcaster for the AJHL's Whitecourt Wolverines, airing every game on air and online.

On August 20, 2018, the Jim Pattison Group announced its intent to acquire Fabmar Communications pending CRTC approval.

References

External links
XM 105 FM
My Town Today
 

Ixm
Ixm
Whitecourt
Radio stations established in 2006
2006 establishments in Alberta